Grigor Jaghetyan ( 1885 in Ijevan - 1938) was an Armenian politician who served as Minister of Finance of the First Republic of Armenia in 1919.

He was chairman of the State Bank of Armenia from 1924 to 1930.

References 

Armenian politicians
1885 births
1938 deaths
People from Ijevan
People of the First Republic of Armenia
Finance ministers of Armenia
Chairmen of the Central Bank of Armenia
Soviet bankers